Sørlandssenteret is among the largest shopping centres in Norway and Northern Europe. It lies 12 km east of Kristiansand, close to the popular Kristiansand Zoo and Amusement Park. Sørlandssenteret was built in 1987. The mall expanded in 1995 and 2013. In 2005 the mall had over 3.6 million visitors. From October 2013, after extensive development, the center now has a surface area of 110,500 m², there are 195 shops and 4,000 parking spaces. It is the Nordic region's third largest shopping center.

External links
Official website, in Norwegian
Sørlandssenteret Shopping Mall  www.visitnorway.com

Shopping centres in Norway
Geography of Kristiansand
Buildings and structures in Agder